Radiocentre is the industry body for commercial radio in the UK. It exists to maintain and build a strong and successful commercial radio industry. The organisation works on behalf of over 40 stakeholders who operate over 300 licensed radio stations across the UK and represent 90% of commercial radio in terms of listening and revenue. 

Radiocentre performs three main functions on behalf of its members.

 Advertising: Drive industry revenue by promoting the benefits of radio to advertisers and agencies, asking them to see radio differently through a combination of marketing activity (events, advertising, PR), research, and training
 Policy: Provide UK commercial radio with a collective voice on issues that affect the way that radio stations operate, working with government, politicians, policy makers and regulators to secure the best environment for growth and development of the medium
 Clearance: Ensure advertising messages on commercial radio stations comply with the necessary content rules and standards laid out in the BCAP Code of Broadcast Advertising and the Ofcom Broadcasting Code.

Background
Radiocentre's Chief Executive Matt Payton was appointed in July 2022. The current Chair is Howell James CBE.

Its predecessor Commercial Radio Companies Association (CRCA) was founded by the first radio companies under the name Association of Independent Radio Companies (AIRC) when independent radio began with LBC and Capital in 1973. It became the CRCA in 1996. Since it was founded the body has always represented the interests of UK commercial radio to Government, Parliament, Ofcom, the European Commission, the European Parliament and other organisations concerned with radio and broadcasting. These functions continue to be administered under the Radiocentre name by the External Affairs department.

Radiocentre is a patron of cross-industry registered charity the Radio Academy as well as being the joint owner of the national radio ratings analyst Radio Joint Audience Research Ltd (RAJAR) and online audio player Radioplayer alongside the BBC.

Departments
Radiocentre offers three areas of expertise each with different functions: Policy, Advertising (formerly the Radio Advertising Bureau (RAB)) and Clearance (formerly the Radio Advertising Clearance Centre (RACC)).

The RAB was founded in 1992. It is the marketing body for radio, funded entirely by the UK commercial radio industry. The RAB works for the commercial success of radio, raising its profile with advertisers and agencies and helping them use the medium more effectively and creatively.

The Radio Advertising Clearance Centre (RACC), which since 1996 has been the UK commercial radio industry's advertising clearance body, is responsible for clearing up to 25,000 ads per year against the UK Code of Broadcast Advertising (BCAP Code) as developed by the UK Advertising Standards Authority (ASA). This regulatory code, plus nearly 60 Acts of UK Parliament, determine what can and cannot be said in all UK radio advertisements. All stations contribute to the cost via their broadcasting licence fees.

Members
Radiocentre member stations together represent approximately 90% of commercial radio listening. Any commercial radio station in the UK holding a terrestrial radio broadcasting licence from Ofcom is eligible to become a station member of the Radiocentre. Major member groups are Global Radio and Bauer Media, while regional groups include Nation Broadcasting and DC Thomson.

Industry collaborations
Radiocentre leads or collaborates on many industry-wide initiatives.

Mental Health Minute 
Since 2018, the Mental Health Minute has brought together commercial radio, BBC stations and community radio to broadcast a unique, one-minute message during Mental Health Awareness Week on the importance of talking about mental health issues, reaching out for support or to check in on someone who may be suffering, and listening to each other. It broadcasts to one of radio's biggest collective audiences, with an average listenership of more than 20 million.

Led by Radiocentre in collaboration with The Royal Foundation's Heads Together initiative, the minute features His Royal Highness The Duke of Cambridge with recognisable voices from music, film, TV and sport, with 2020's edition including England football captain Harry Kane, singer-songwriter Dua Lipa, actor David Tennant and two-time heavyweight champion Anthony Joshua, as well as The Duchess of Cambridge for the first time.

Young Audio Awards 
Launched in 2018 and formerly known as the Young ARIAS, the Young Audio Awards are an annual awards event that celebrates radio and audio created by under-18s at school radio stations, local projects and as individuals. They provide young audio talent across the UK with a chance to gain exposure and a better understanding of the radio industry, ultimately widening the talent pool to ensure a diverse industry. Winners are also offered mentoring, studio tours, the chance to work on a national station and improved audio equipment.

Diversity Masterclasses 
Radiocentre works closely with Creative Access to try and improve the representation of young people from BAME backgrounds and those with a lower socioeconomic status, hosting radio masterclasses for Creative Access interns who are looking to start careers in radio and audio.

Radioplayer 
Radioplayer is a radio technology platform, owned by UK radio broadcasters and operated under licence in more than a dozen other countries. It operates an internet radio web tuner, a set of mobile phone apps, an in-car adaptor, and a growing range of integrations with other connected devices and platforms.

AER 
The Association of European Radios (AER) is the Europe-wide trade body for commercial radio, representing the interests of over 5,000 commercial radio stations to the EU Institutions. AER promotes the development of European commercially funded radio broadcasting, by ensuring a fair and sustainable economic framework for radio to thrive in. Radiocentre is a member of the AER.

References

External links
 
 RAB website
 JICRIT website

Broadcasting in the United Kingdom
Media and communications in the London Borough of Camden
Organisations based in the London Borough of Camden
Organizations established in 2006
Radio organisations in the United Kingdom
2006 establishments in the United Kingdom